Aguadilla Divas is a defunct female professional volleyball team that was part of the Female Superior Volleyball League and  played in Aguadilla, Puerto Rico, until January 4, 2006. Its home arena was Luis T. Diaz Coliseum. Willie Lopez ran the team, with practices held in nearby Moca at the Juan Sanchez Acevedo Coliseum.

The record for their first season (2006) was 1-21. In 2007, their record was 4–17.

References

Aguadilla, Puerto Rico
Puerto Rican volleyball clubs